Indian Sands may refer to:
Indian Sands (Carpenterville, Oregon), listed on the NRHP in Oregon
Indian Sands (Brookings, Oregon), listed on the NRHP in Oregon